Scopula sparsipunctata is a moth of the  family Geometridae. It is found on Madagascar and the Seychelles.

Subspecies
Scopula sparsipunctata sparsipunctata (Madagascar)
Scopula sparsipunctata menaiensis Legrand, 1958 (Seychelles: Menai, Cosmoledo and Aldabra)

References

Moths described in 1900
sparsipunctata
Moths of Madagascar
Moths of Africa